Rim Ping is a village and tambon (sub-district) of Mueang Lamphun District, in Lamphun Province, Thailand. In 2005 it had a total population of 7078 people. The tambon contains 10 villages.

References

Tambon of Lamphun province
Populated places in Lamphun province